San Juan, officially the Municipality of San Juan (Kabalian: Lungsod san San Juan;), is a 5th class municipality in the province of Southern Leyte, Philippines. According to the 2020 census, it has a population of 14,912 people.

It was formerly known as Cabali-an.

The Kabalian language, a Visayan language distinct from Waray-Waray and Cebuano, is spoken in San Juan.

History

There seems to be no consensus on the exact origin of the name Cabali-an. While there are several versions, the most popular one involves Magellan who happened to pass by Cabalian. This account tells of Magellan and his crew attempting to land this settlement after being battered by a heavy storm known locally as “subasco”. One of his ships had a broken main mast that required immediate repair. The curious natives led by their chieftain, Datu Malitik, gathered on the shore as they closely watched the approaching ships. The natives who were armed noticed the broken mast and shouted “gikabali-an”. Roughly translated, the word means “to experience a breakage or broken materials”. Magellan and his men interpreted the hostile-surrounding shouts as the name of the place. Not wishing to engage the natives in combat after the battering of the storm, the explorers lifted anchors and sailed away. 

On June 17, 1961, Republic Act 3088, which changed the name Cabali-an to San Juan, was signed into law by the President of the Republic of the Philippines. However, up to this day, the town is still known as Cabali-an. The name simply refuses to disappear on maps, telecommunication directories and in most people's minds.

On September 15, 2010, San Juan celebrated its 150th Founding Anniversary.

Geography

Barangays
San Juan (Cabali-an) is politically subdivided into 18 barangays.
	Agay-ay
	Basak
	Bobon A
	Bobon B
	Dayanog
	Garrido
	Minoyho
	Osao
	Pong-oy
	San Jose (Poblacion)
	San Roque
	San Vicente
	Santa Cruz (Poblacion)
	Santa Filomena
	Santo Niño (Poblacion)
	Somoje
	Sua
	Timba

Climate

Demographics

Economy

Government

Elected officials
Members of the municipal council (2019-2022):
 Municipal Mayor: Virgilio A. Mortera
 Municipal Vice Mayor: Lolito A. Casera, Jr.
 Council Members:
 Evencio Castillones
 Rodulfo B. Capote, Jr.
 Sixto B. Evaldez
 Valentin Ouano, Jr.
 Reynaldo E. Ramos
 Reynaldo A. Orozco
 Edilberto Cinco
 Victor M. Cero
 Terencio Montefolka - Association of the Barangay Chairmen President
 Jose Michael Lepiten III - Sangguniang Kabataan Municipal President

Communication 
Mobile:
 Serviced by Smart Communications (Since 2002)
 Serviced by Globe Telecom (Since 2004)
 Serviced by Sun Cellular (Since 2010)

Cable television:
Fiesta Cable Inc. is the first cable TV entirely Pacific Area in Province.  Fiesta Cable's main office is located in Rizal Street, Barangay Santo Nino, San Juan, Southern Leyte.

Culture

Festival
The town celebrates its rich Catholic heritage every 24th day of June, the Solemnity of the Nativity of St. John the Baptist, Precursor to the Divine Word, Our Lord Jesus Christ. The "novemdiales" or novena in honor of the patron saint commences every 15th day of June, and is referred to as jornadas. Jornadas in Spanish means "sojourns" or "journeys", which specifically refer to the translation of the patron saints of all barangays to kiosks or minuscule chapels outside the baroque parish church. In addition to the eighteen patron saints of the 18 barangays of Cabalian, more come from the hill villages of Hinunangan. They remain in those chapels until the 24th day of June, called the kahuyugan, whence they are processed around the town in andas and carrozas.

The fiesta spans for three (3) days: (1) disperas (Sp. vísperas) which falls on the 23rd day of June, coinciding with the Vespers for the Nativity of St. John the Baptist in the Divine Office; (2) kahuyugan (lit. the day on which the fiesta falls) on the 24th of June, coinciding with the main celebrations; and (3) liwas (lit. post-fiesta) on the 25th day of June, when the remaining victuals are served to fiesta-goers who want to avoid the fiesta traffic and hullabaloo.

The novena is said in the parish church. Preserving the incorruptible tradition of Visayan Catholic identity, the long Gozos in honor of St. John is sung. The tradition of the gozos goes back to the august cathedrals of Spain and Portugal. The structure of the gozos follows the usual format of the Spanish gozos: an estribillo (couplet) repeated after every estrofa (verse).

Although, the Solemnity of the Nativity of St. John the Baptist was traditionally not celebrated with water dousing, sometime in 2000, the LGU launched the Sinabligay Festival, which translates as Water Dousing Festival. The LGU has passed ordinances prohibiting the use of dirty water during this Festival.

Amongst the activities included in the Town and Patronal Fiesta are the following
 SLSU Alumni Homecoming, organized by the Southern Leyte State University
 SJNHS Grand Alumni Homecoming, organized by the San Juan National High School
 Parish Pastoral Night
 The Search for Ms. TEEN Cabalian, organized by the Municipal Federation of Sangguniang Kabataan, in partnership with KUYOGG Inc. (Kabalian United Youth Organization for Good Governance.
 The  "Sinabligay Festival"
 The "Wet and Wild Party"

See also
List of renamed cities and municipalities in the Philippines

References

External links

 
 San Juan Profile at PhilAtlas.com

Municipalities of Southern Leyte